The Hartwell Railroad  dates to 1878 when the company was chartered to build a  narrow gauge rail line between Hartwell and Bowersville in Hart County, Georgia. The 10-mile railroad was completed the following year. In 1898, it was reorganized as the Hartwell Railway.

The Hartwell Railway's line today is operated by the Great Walton Railroad, based in Social Circle, Georgia, which also operates Athens Line, LLC. In the Jackson County, Georgia community of Center, the Hartwell Railway connects with Norfolk Southern Railway.

Currently, the rail line along Highway 51, including the Depot and Platform are being rented to TORCH of Hartwell, Inc. TORCH of Hartwell, Inc. plans on revitalizing the rail line into a community park with the support of grants, The City of Hartwell and residents. 

The railroad's roster consists of older EMD 4-axle locomotives still in the paint schemes of the Denver & Rio Grande Western, Conrail, and Richmond, Fredericksburg and Potomac Railroad.

References 

2. History of Hartwell Railroad 
 Storey, Steve, Hartwell Railroad.  Retrieved August 31, 2005.

External links 
 Railfanning.org: Hartwell Railroad/Great Walton Railroad
 Athens Banner-Herald: Side Tracks, Short-line rail companies weight on routes that otherwise might have been abandoned
 Photos of the Hartwell Railroad from the late 1980s through the 1990s
 HawkinsRails Hartwell pages

Georgia (U.S. state) railroads
Transportation in Hart County, Georgia
Non-operating common carrier freight railroads in the United States
Narrow gauge railroads in Georgia (U.S. state)
3 ft gauge railways in the United States
Hartwell, Georgia